Pilgrim Hill is a 2013 Irish rural drama film. Writer and director Gerard Barrett won the Rising Star Award at the 10th Irish Film & Television Awards.

The film depicts the solitary life of an Irish dairy farmer, living with only his invalided father in a remote Irish location. The film catalogues his daily farming routine as well as his rather limited encounters with others. The Irish Times (in a four-star review) wrote: "Barrett's debut feature is a quietly stunning slice of rural naturalism. A masterful debut."

References

External links 
 
Official site
Irish Times Review
RTE Review
Newstalk Review
Interview with Gerard Barrett

2013 films
Irish drama films
Films directed by Gerard Barrett
2013 directorial debut films
2013 drama films
2010s English-language films